Htantabin Township is a township located on the western border of central Yangon Region, Burma (Myanmar).  Its administrative seat is Htantabin which is located in the southeastern part of the township on the western bank of the Hlaing River just south of its confluence with the Kokkowa River.

The township is partially urbanized, although it is not part of the city of Yangon.  The majority of the land is still in agriculture.  In addition to agricultural work on the farms, the main sources of employment are as factory workers, temporary manual labor, as civil servants, and work in a variety of small to medium-size businesses. Htantabin township is home to the University of West Yangon.

The township will be home to a 270 megawatt coal-fired power plant built by Htoo Trading, which will supply electricity to Yangon's industrial zones.

Communities
There are 59 Village Tracts in the township consisting of 230 villages.

Human Rights Violations in the Region
On 29 December 1994 at 11:00 p.m., SLORC troops from IB 73 threw a grenade into a crowd while they were holding a religious ceremony in In Gyin Koe Village, Htantabin Township, Pegu Division, causing the deaths of 10 villagers and wounding 24 others. [PDC] 

On February 5, 1998 Burmese Army troops tortured, shot and killed a pastor, Maung Ohn Kyi, and his son-in-law in Kawtupoe village of Htantabin township.

Borders
The township's eastern border is formed by the Hlaing River. Its southwestern boundary is formed by the Panhlaing River and part of its western border is formed by the Bawle River.  Htantabin Township borders with:
 Zalun Township, Ayeyarwady Region, to the northwest;
 Taikkyi Township to the northeast and east;
 Hmawbi Township and Shwepyitha Township to the east;
 Hlaingthaya Township to the southeast;
 Twante Township to the southwest; and
 Nyaungdon Township and Danubyu Township of Ayeyarwady Region, to the west.

Notes

External links
 "Htantabin Township, Yangon Division" map ID: MIMU154 Htantabin Township 090423 v02, April 2009, Myanmar Information Management Unit (MIMU)
 "Htantabin Google Satellite Map" Maplandia World Gazetteer

Townships of Yangon Region
Yangon Region